Heinrich VII, Prince Reuss of Köstritz (14 July 1825, Klipphausen – 2 May 1906, Trzebiechów) was a German diplomat.

Early life 
Prince Heinrich VII Reuss of Köstritz was born in 1825 as the fifth child and third son of Prince Heinrich LXIII, Prince Reuss of Köstritz and his first wife, Countess Eleonore of Stolberg-Wernigerode (1801-1827).

Biography 
From 1845 to 1848 he studied law at Ruprecht Karls University of Heidelberg and Humboldt University of Berlin.  He then joined the 8th Lancers Regiment.  From 1853, he pursued a diplomatic career.

From 1854 to 1863 he worked as a diplomat (Legationsrat) in the Prussian embassy in Paris.  Then he was sent as Prussian royal ambassador to Kassel, and later to Munich.  On 5 February 1868 he was posted as envoy extraordinary and minister plenipotentiary of the North German Confederation to the Russian court at St. Petersburg by William I, who was still King of Prussia at that time.  On 26 April 1871 he was designated the first ambassador of the German Empire by William, who had been crowned Emperor a few months earlier.

From 1873 to 1876 he served Emperor William I as adjutant general, and was eventually promoted to General of the Cavalry. In 1876 he married Princess Marie Alexandrine of Saxe-Weimar-Eisenach.  In that same year, the prince became a member of the Prussian House of Lords.  In 1877, he was the first imperial ambassador to Constantinople, where he opened the magnificent Embassy building, which he was allowed to set up to his own taste.  Just one year later he went as German ambassador to Vienna; this was his last foreign assignment.

In 1894, he retired to his castle in Trzebiechów, where he died on 2 May 1906.

Family and issue 
On 6 February 1876, Heinrich VII married Princess Marie Alexandrine of Saxe-Weimar-Eisenach, daughter of Grand Duke Charles Alexander of Saxe-Weimar-Eisenach.
From this marriage, he had the following children:
 Unnamed son (1877–1877)
 Heinrich XXXII (1878–1935)
 married in 1920 (divorced 1921) Princess Marie Adelaide of Lippe (1895–1993)
 Heinrich XXXIII (1879–1942)
 married firstly in 1913 (divorced 1922) Princess Victoria Margaret of Prussia (1890–1923)
 married secondly in 1929 (divorced 1935) Allene Tew (1876–1955)
 Johanna (1882–1883)
 Sophie Renate (1884–1968)
 married in 1909 Prince Heinrich XXXIV Reuss (1887–1956)
 Heinrich XXXV (1887–1936). He married firstly, Princess Marie of Saxe-Altenburg (1888–1947) on 20 April 1911 in Altenburg. They had one daughter before divorcing in 1921. He married secondly in 1921 (divorced 1923) Princess Marie Adelaide of Lippe (1895–1993)
Marie Helene Reuss of Köstritz (b. 23 February 1912, Silesia - d. 1 August 1933, Korfantow)

Honours
He received the following orders and decorations:

Ancestry

References

Literature 
 Kurt von Priesdorff: Soldatisches Führertum, vol. 9, Hanseatische Verlagsanstalt, Hamburg, 1941
 

Germany–Ottoman Empire relations
1825 births
1906 deaths
Princes of Reuss
People from Meissen (district)
Members of the Prussian House of Lords
Heidelberg University alumni
Humboldt University of Berlin alumni
Ambassadors of Germany to Austria
Ambassadors of Germany to Turkey
Generals of Cavalry (Prussia)
Commandeurs of the Légion d'honneur
Recipients of the Order of the Netherlands Lion
Grand Crosses of the Order of Saint Stephen of Hungary
Recipients of the Order of St. Vladimir, 2nd class